Ting Cui (born September 6, 2002) is an American figure skater. She is the 2018 CS Tallinn Trophy silver medalist, the 2018 U.S. junior national bronze medalist, and the 2019 Junior Worlds bronze medalist.

Personal life 
Ting Cui was born on September 6, 2002, in Baltimore, Maryland, the eldest child of Lily and Larry Cui. She graduated from Towson High School in 2020.
She is currently enrolled at Middlebury College in Vermont.

Career

Early years 
Cui began learning to skate in 2009. She received a pewter medal after finishing fourth in the intermediate category at the 2015 U.S. Championships. Two years later, she won silver in the novice ranks at the 2017 U.S. Championships.

2017–2018 season 
Cui made her ISU Junior Grand Prix (JGP) debut in August, placing sixth in Brisbane, Australia. In January, she won the junior bronze medal at the 2018 U.S. Championships, having finished third behind Alysa Liu and Pooja Kalyan after placing eleventh in the short and second in the free.  She placed seventh at the 2018 World Junior Championships in Sofia, Bulgaria. She was coached by Vincent Restencourt in Aston, Pennsylvania until the end of the season. In June, she joined Tom Zakrajsek in Colorado Springs, Colorado.

2018–2019 season 
Cui began her season on the JGP series, placing fifth in Linz, Austria, and then seventh in Ostrava, Czech Republic. Making her senior international debut, she won silver at the 2018 CS Tallinn Trophy in November.

At the 2019 U.S. Championships, Cui debuted on the senior level domestically.  She placed twelfth in the short program after falling twice and failing to execute a combination.  She rallied in the free skate, where she placed third, rising to fifth place overall. Cui said afterward that it "felt amazing, and the audience was so different from juniors. I could feel the energy from the crowd, and I was just so happy, and people were on their feet too, which was really amazing."  Cui was then assigned to the 2019 World Junior Championships alongside pewter medalist Hanna Harrell. Because both Harrell and gold medalist Alysa Liu were ineligible for senior international competition, Cui was also assigned to the 2019 Four Continents Championship.

Competing at Four Continents, Cui placed seventh in the short program.  Despite an edge call on her flip, she said it was "so much fun skating for the crowd, especially during my footwork, that was great. It’s my first Championship event, and I really want to enjoy every moment of it."  In the free program, she fell three times and finished in eleventh place overall.

She won the bronze medal at the 2019 World Junior Championships after placing third in both segments, becoming the first American lady to medal at Junior Worlds since Gracie Gold in 2012.

2019–2020 season 
Cui suffered from a serious ankle injury over the summer but returned to compete at the 2019 U.S. Classic, where she finished fourth.  On October 9, 2019, Cui announced that she had reinjured her ankle in training and would consequently withdraw from her Grand Prix assignments for the year, the Internationaux de France and NHK Trophy.

In January, Cui qualified for the 2020 U.S. Championships but withdrew in December 2019 to focus on recovering from her ankle injury.

2020–2021 season 
Cui switched coaches from Tom Zakrajsek to Natalia Linichuk in Newark, Delaware during the offseason. She did not compete at either 2020 Skate America or the 2021 U.S. Championships.

While appearing on Polina Edmunds's podcast, on an episode that was released in February 2021, Cui said she was training in Lake Placid, New York with Paul Wylie and was still recovering from her injury. She said she was working on getting her triples consistent and looking to return and compete for the next season. Cui also said her coaching situation for the upcoming season would be dependent upon several factors, including where she decided to attend college.

Programs

Competitive highlights 
GP: Grand Prix; CS: ISU Challenger Series; JGP: Junior Grand Prix

Detailed results 
Small medals for short and free programs awarded only at ISU Championships.

Senior level

Junior level

References

External links 
 

2002 births
American female single skaters
Living people
Sportspeople from Baltimore
World Junior Figure Skating Championships medalists
21st-century American women
Competitors at the 2023 Winter World University Games